Henrietta Matilda Jane Evans (née Congreve) (7 August 1827 – 22 October 1886) was an Australian novelist, who wrote under the pseudonym Maud Jean Franc.

Life
Matilda was the elder daughter of Dr Henry Congreve and his wife Elizabeth Ann, née Jacob of Peckham, England. The family moved to South Australia in 1852, started a school at Mount Barker and on 16 February 1860 Matilda married the Rev. Ephraim Evans, a Baptist minister, who died 6 April 1863. In 1860 Mrs Evans opened a school at Angaston which was still in existence in 1868. She wrote her first story, Marian; or the light of Some One's Home while she was at Mount Barker and it appears to have been immediately successful. The British Museum catalogue records an edition published at Bath in 1860, a second edition was published by John Darton and Company in 1861, and another edition published by Sampson Low appeared in the same year.

Evans had chosen as a pseudonym Maud Jean Franc, but in her later books variations in the spelling of both Maud and Jean appeared. Her second book Vermont Vale came out in 1866 and during the next 19 years 13 other volumes were published. She died of peritonitis in 1886 and was survived by two sons. The elder, Henry Congreve Evans (died 1899) was leader of the staff of the Adelaide Advertiser and author of the libretto of Immomeena: an Australian Comic Opera published in 1893. The younger, William James Evans, was joint author with his mother of Christmas Bells, a collection of short stories published in 1882. He also published in 1898 Rhymes without Reason and died in 1904.

The stories of Maud Jean Franc were often reprinted. A collected edition in 13 volumes was published in 1888 and 40 years after. They are pleasantly told tales somewhat sentimental and rhetorical in style, sincerely religious and didactic in theme.

Bibliography
Marian; or the light of Some One's Home (1860)
second edition (1861)
Vermont Vale (1866)
Emily's Choice (1867)
Minnie's Mission: an Australian Temperance Tale (1869)
Golden Gifts (1869)
Silken Cords and Iron Fetters (1870)
John's Wife (1874)
Hall's Vineyard (1875)
Little Mercy (1878)
Beatrice Melton's Discipline (1880)
The Master of Ralston (1880)
Jem's hopes : and how they were realized (1881)
No Longer a Child (1882)
Two Sides to Every Question (1883)
At the Well (1883)
Into the Light (1885)
Fern hollow, or, Old life in new lands (1885)

References

Sources

H. J. Finnis, "Evans, Matilda Jane (1827 - 1886)", Australian Dictionary of Biography, Volume 4, Melbourne University Press, 1972, p. 143. Retrieved on 12 October 2008
Allen,Margaret  Matilda Jane Evans 1827 - 1886 deaconess 200 Australian Women, Pandora,NLA
Evans, Matilda Jane (1827–1886) Obituaries Australia, National Centre of Biography, Australian National University,

External links

Franc, Maud Jeanne WorldCat

1827 births
1886 deaths
19th-century Australian novelists
Australian women novelists
Australian Baptists
19th-century Australian women writers
19th-century Baptists
19th-century pseudonymous writers
Pseudonymous women writers